The United States Ambassador to Luxembourg oversees the U.S. Embassy in that country.  They supervise the embassy staff in the conduct of diplomatic relations with the Grand Duchy of Luxembourg and coordination of the activities of U.S. Government personnel serving in Luxembourg as well as official visitors.  Under the ambassador's direction, the embassy staff provides consular services, including visas for visitors to the United States and passports for United States citizens in Luxembourg.

The United States has maintained diplomatic relations with Luxembourg since 1903.

From 1903 to 1923 the ambassador to the Netherlands served concurrently as ambassador to Luxembourg.

From 1923 until World War II the ambassador to Belgium also served as ambassador to Luxembourg.

During World War II the United States maintained diplomatic relations with the Luxembourg government in exile.

After World War II, the United States returned to appointing the ambassador to Belgium concurrently as the ambassador to Luxembourg.

Since 1956 the United States Ambassador to Luxembourg has been appointed separately from the ambassador to the Netherlands.

This is a complete list of United States envoys and ambassadors appointed to Luxembourg since 1903:

United States Ambassadors to The Netherlands and Luxembourg
 Stanford Newel 1903–1905
 David Jayne Hill 1905–1908
 Arthur M. Beaupre 1908–1911
 Lloyd Bryce 1911–1913
 Henry van Dyke 1913–1917
 John W. Garrett 1917–1919
 William Phillips 1920–1922
 Henry P. Fletcher 1923–1924
 William Phillips 1924–1927

United States Ambassadors to Luxembourg government in exile
 Jay Pierrepont Moffat 1941–1943
 Ray Atherton 1943
 Anthony J. Drexel Biddle Jr. 1943
 Rudolf E. Schoenfeld 1944

United States Ambassadors to Belgium and Luxembourg
 Charles W. Sawyer 1944–1945
 Alan G. Kirk 1946–1949
 Perle Mesta 1949–1953
 Wiley T. Buchanan Jr. 1953–1956

United States Ambassadors to Luxembourg
 Wiley T. Buchanan Jr. 1956
 Vinton Chapin 1957–1960
 A. Burks Summers 1960–1961
 James Wine 1961–1962
 William R. Rivkin 1962–1965
 Patricia Roberts Harris 1965–1967
 George J. Feldman 1967–1969
 Kingdon Gould Jr. 1969–1972
 Ruth Lewis Farkas 1973–1976
 Rosemary L. Ginn 1976–1977
 James G. Lowenstein 1977–1981
 John E. Dolibois 1981–1985
 Jean Broward Shevlin Gerard 1985–1990
 Frederick Morris Bush
 Edward Morgan Rowell 1990–1994
 Clay Constantinou 1994–1999
 James Hormel 1999–2001
 Gerald Loftus 2001–2002
 Peter Terpeluk Jr. 2002–2005
 Ann Wagner 2005–2009
 Cynthia Stroum 2009–2011
 Robert A. Mandell 2011–2015
 David McKean 2016–2017
 Randy Evans 2018–2021
 Tom Barrett 2022–present

See also
 Embassy of Luxembourg, Washington, D.C.
 Luxembourg – United States relations
 Foreign relations of Luxembourg
 Ambassadors of the United States

Notes

References
 
 United States Department of State: Background notes on Luxembourg

External links
 United States Department of State: Chiefs of Mission for Luxembourg
 United States Department of State: Luxembourg
 United States Embassy in Luxembourg

Luxembourg
United States